Telibanovo is a rural locality (a village) in Sizemskoye Rural Settlement, Sheksninsky District, Vologda Oblast, Russia. The population was 14 as of 2002.

Geography 
Telibanovo is located 69 km north of Sheksna (the district's administrative centre) by road. Solovarka is the nearest rural locality.

References 

Rural localities in Sheksninsky District